Noble Consort Tong (3 June 1817 – 1877), of the Manchu Šumuru clan, was a consort of the Daoguang Emperor. She was 35 years his junior.

Life
Very little is known about Lady Šumuru's life before she entered the Forbidden City.

Family background
Noble Consort Tong's personal name was not recorded in history.

 Father: Yuzhang, served as fifth rank literary official
 One sister: Wife of Fuca Heshun (和顺), a first class imperial guard

Jiaqing Era
Lady Šumuru was born on the 3rd day of the fourth lunar month in the twenty-first year of the reign of the Jiaqing Emperor, which translates to 3 June 1817 in the Gregorian calendar.

Daoguang Era
Lady Šumuru was entered the palace somewhere in 1831, at the age of fourteen or fifteen. She was given an honorary name along with her rank, "Noble Lady Mu" (睦貴人). Her residence became Xianfu palace on the west side of Forbidden City. In December 1832 or January 1833 Lady Šumuru was promoted to "Concubine Tong" (彤嬪). On 3 December 1834, she was promoted to "Consort Tong" (彤妃). On 26 January 1837, Lady Šumuru was given the prestigious promotion to "Noble Consort Tong" (彤貴妃), now twenty or twenty one, and having been in the palace for just six years. On 30 July 1840, Noble Consort Tong gave birth to seventh princess, who would die prematurely on 27 January 1845. On 7 January 1842, she gave birth to eighth princess, Princess Shouxi of the Second Rank. On 4 May 1844, Lady Šumuru, gave birth to tenth princess, who would die prematurely on 26 February 1845. Lady Šumuru was demoted to "Noble Lady Tong" (彤貴人) on 21 October 1844 after she had given her gifts to an eunuch, Li Dexi. It was a serious offense; in 1778, Consort Dun was demoted one rank for killing a servant, while Lady Šumuru was demoted three ranks. In 1845 she lost two daughters in the span of a month: The seventh Princess in January, and the tenth Princess in February.

Xianfeng Era
Lady Šumuru had held in her new rank for about nearly six years when the Xianfeng Emperor established her as "Dowager Imperial Concubine Tong" (彤嬪), in February or March of 1850, following the Emperor's passing. In 1860, she received New Year gifts together with Imperial Noble Consort Zhuangshun, Noble Consort Cheng, First Class Attendant Cai and Consort Xiang. At that time, her residence in the Forbidden City was Central Longevity Palace. She stayed in the Forbidden City with First Class Attendant Shang and another dowager concubines, while five of them fled to Rehe together with Xianfeng Emperor.

Tongzhi Era
In 1863, her second daughter, princess Shouxi of the Second Rank married Niohuru Jalafungga. In December 1874 or January 1875, Lady Šumuru was finally restored as "Noble Consort Tong" (彤貴妃). She died shortly after in 1877, and was interred in Mu Mausoleum of the Western Qing tombs.

Titles
 During the reign of the Jiaqing Emperor (r. 1796–1820):
 Lady Šumuru (from 3 June 1817)
 During the reign of the Daoguang Emperor (r. 1820–1850):
 Noble Lady Mu (from 1831), sixth rank consort
 Concubine Tong (from December 1832 or January 1833), fifth rank consort
 Consort Tong (from 3 December 1834), fourth rank consort
 Noble Consort Tong (from 26 January 1837), third rank consort
 Noble Lady Tong (from 21 October 1844), sixth rank consort
 During the reign of the Xianfeng Emperor (r. 1850–1861):
 Concubine Tong (from February/March 1850), fifth rank consort
 During the reign of the Tongzhi Emperor (r. 1861–1875):
 Noble Consort Tong (from December 1874 or January 1875), third rank consort

Issue
 As Noble Consort Tong:
 The Daoguang Emperor's seventh daughter (30 July 1840 – 27 January 1845)
 Princess Shouxi of the Second Rank (7 January 1842 – 10 September 1866), the Daoguang Emperor's eighth daughter
 Married Jalafungga (d. 1898) of the Manchu Niohuru clan in November/December 1863
 The Daoguang Emperor's tenth daughter (4 May 1844 – 26 February 1845)

Gallery

In fiction and popular culture
 Portrayed by Deborah Poon in Curse of the Royal Harem (2011)

See also
 Ranks of imperial consorts in China#Qing
 Royal and noble ranks of the Qing dynasty

Notes

References
 

1817 births
1877 deaths
Consorts of the Daoguang Emperor
Manchu people